Hugô St-Onge is a politician in Quebec, Canada. Since 2002, he has been the leader of the Bloc pot. The Bloc pot is a Quebec political party dedicated to the end of marijuana prohibition.

He founded in 1999 along with other Bloc pot activists the Club compassion of Montreal a collective project to distribute cannabis for medicinal uses.

In May 2000 he collaborated in the creation a new political party in Nova Scotia called The Marijuana Party of Canada.

Electoral record

2007 Quebec general election, Gouin, 147 votes (winning candidate: Nicolas Girard, Parti Québécois)
2006 Canadian federal election, Rosemont—La Petite-Patrie, 419 votes (winning candidate: Bernard Bigras, Bloc Québécois)
Quebec by-election, 2004, Gouin, 148 votes (winning candidate: Nicolas Girard, Parti Québécois)
2003 Nova Scotia general election, Dartmouth East, 101 votes (winning candidate: Joan Massey, New Democratic Party)
2003 Quebec general election, Gouin, 465 votes (winning candidate: André Boisclair, Parti Québécois)
Quebec by-election, 2001, Labelle, 350 votes (winning candidate: Sylvain Pagé, Parti Québécois)
1998 Quebec general election, Marguerite-D'Youville, 327 votes (winning candidate: François Beaulne, Parti Québécois)

References 

Canadian cannabis activists
Living people
Quebec political party leaders
Quebec candidates for Member of Parliament
Candidates in Quebec provincial elections
Candidates in Nova Scotia provincial elections
Bloc pot politicians
Year of birth missing (living people)